Alice Artzt (born March 16, 1943) is an American guitarist from New York City.

She studied with Julian Bream, Ida Presti and Alexandre Lagoya and made her concert debut in 1969 at the Wigmore Hall, London. Since then, she has played concerts in parts of Europe, Africa, Central America, Asia, the United States, and South America.

She is an avid Charlie Chaplin enthusiast.

External links
 Alice Artz on Ida Presti's Technique
  Views on Bach: an historical perspective EGTA Guitar Journal no. 3 (1992)

1943 births
American classical guitarists
Living people
Women classical guitarists
Guitarists from New York City
20th-century American women guitarists
20th-century American guitarists
Classical musicians from New York (state)
21st-century American women